iTunes Live: London Festival '08 may refer to:

 The 2008 iTunes Festival
 iTunes Live: London Festival '08 (Elliot Minor EP), 2008
 iTunes Live: London Festival '08 (Feeder EP), 2008
 iTunes Live: London Festival '08 (Gemma Hayes EP)
 iTunes Live: London Festival '08 (The Zutons EP), 2008